Stefan Habas (born 21 April 1971) is a Polish skier. He competed in the Nordic combined event at the 1992 Winter Olympics.

References

External links
 

1971 births
Living people
Polish male Nordic combined skiers
Olympic Nordic combined skiers of Poland
Nordic combined skiers at the 1992 Winter Olympics
Sportspeople from Zakopane
20th-century Polish people